This is a list of the France national football team results from 1904 to 1920. Between their first match in 1904 and 1920, France played in 43 matches, resulting in 13 victories, 5 draws and 25 defeats. Throughout this period they participated in two Olympic Football Tournaments in 1908 and in 1920, and on both occasions, they reached the semi-finals before being knocked out by the eventual runner-ups, Denmark and Czechoslovakia respectively.

1900s

1904

1905

1906

1907

1908

1909

1910s

1910

1911

1912

1913

1914

1919

1920

See also 
 France national football team results (unofficial matches)

References

External links 
 FFF Match Archive

1900s in France
1910s in France
1920 in France
1900s